Turf is a location-based mobile game with MMO elements developed by Swedish video game developer Andrimon. It was released on 10 July 2010 for Android, and later for iOS. The game was originally created by Andreas Pantesjö and Simon Sikström, who still actively maintain and develop the game. The game has around 315,000 registered players and is free to play. Players can pay a voluntary fee to receive "supporter" status, which gives access to additional in-app statistics, but comes with no gameplay benefits. The game has received media attention from Swedish, Finnish, Danish and British newspapers and media.

Gameplay 
Turf combines elements from traditional orienteering with elements commonly seen in many video games, such as a leveling system, leaderboards and achievements. The goal is to collect points by capturing virtual zones using the built-in GPS system of modern smartphones, and try to keep them for as long as possible to compete with other players. Zones are located all over the world, but with the highest concentration in countries with active competition, such as Sweden, Finland, Denmark, Norway and Great Britain. Zones are most commonly taken by foot or by bicycle, but occasionally zones are captured by other means, such as by boat and by car. Turf is used by many players as an exergame, a way of combining exercise with gaming. It has also been compared with augmented reality games Ingress and Pokémon Go.

Game rounds 
Turf is played in rounds that each last for about a month. The rounds reset and start every first Sunday of the month, which leads to rounds of either 28 or 35 days. Collected points by the player reset when a new round starts, as well as all ownership of the zones in the game. Total accumulated points by the player never reset after a round ends, as these are used to determine a player's rank as well as provide useful statistics for players to track their progress. At the end of a round the winner may choose to create a unique, custom zone anywhere, often referred to as a "winner zone".

Events  
There are special events arranged when players gather in a city to compete. A major annual event is called a ”Bonanza”, where participants gather in a city and run a standalone game session that lasts for a few hours. Bonanzas are characterized by dense placement of zones in a game environment separate from the regular game to make the contest a standalone championship. The first Bonanza organized for Djurgården in Stockholm, Sweden, on 21 May 2011. In 2016, it was held in Kalmar. In both 2012 and 2018 it was held in Västerås, Sweden.

Other, smaller, events also occur that are similar to the major annual Bonanza event. They can be situated in different places with different orientations (canoe, only by foot, long seclusion etc.) On 19 June 2011, one of the first Turf events was at Dreamhack in Sweden.

An event can also be a closed event where only the invited have access, with small groups such as school physical education. In 2016, more than 300 physical education lessons consisted of "orientation" of the Turf.

Zones 
Some zones have a special attribute. Those are:

 Bridge: A zone entirely or mostly covering a bridge. A bridge is a structure built to span physical obstacles without closing the way underneath such as a body of water, valley or road, for the purpose of providing passage over the obstacle.  The zone must be possible to take in a safe and secure way from the bridge, but may also be possible to take from under the bridge.
 Castle/Fort: A Castle or Fort that is not in too poor shape or is a museum.
 Holy: A zone entirely or mostly placed in a "Holy" area. A "Holy" area is a compound around a church, mosque, synagogue or similar buildings originally built for a "Holy" purpose. The zone can also be placed just outside the compounds, but then there must be good visual contact with the building so the turfer can get a "Holy experience". Also graveyards without "Holy" buildings are considered as "Holy".
 Monument: A zone placed in the direct vicinity to or directly on a monument. A monument is a type of structure that was explicitly created to commemorate a person or event, or which has become important to a social group as a part of their remembrance of historic times or cultural heritage. The zone name should normally reflect the monument name. Only one zone per monument can have this attribute.
 National Park: A zone in a national park according to the IUCN (International Union for Conservation of Nature) list – not just a preserve. Only one zone per national park can have this attribute.
 Ruins/Ancient Remains: Several hundred year-old, ancient remains of a construction.
 Summit: A zone placed at the highest point in a turf region.  Only one zone per summit and region can have this attribute.
 Train Station: A zone at a train station where passengers can board and exit the train on regular basis. Goods stations, railway stops or halt like a basic commuter stop do not qualify and neither do metro/underground stations, tram stations or the like.  Only one zone per train station can have this attribute.
 Water Zone: A zone placed in the water. The zone shall not be in too shallow waters. At least a few swim strokes are needed in order to reach the zone. Normally the zone is 15 to 30 meters from the shore. The zone must be possible to take in a safe and secure way for a normal swimmer.
 Winner Zone: The winner of the official Turf countries each round gets to place one zone free within the borders of that country.
 World Heritage: A zone at a World Heritage site according to the UNESCO (United Nations Educational, Scientific and Cultural Organization) list. Only one zone per world heritage can have this attribute. This is also valid when the world heritage covers many countries.

Everyone can participate and create pages for zones of which they have knowledge.

Points 

The points that players receive are divided in two categories, takeover points (or TP) and points per hour (or PPH). These points are then also divided into two categories: total points and round points. Round points are points that the player have received during the current round and are reset for the next one. Total points are the total number of points a player has earned throughout his Turf career and also indicate the player's rank.

Takeover points (usually shortened TP) is the sum of points a player receives from a zone takeover. When taking over a zone that is owned by another player, the player receives the points the zone is worth. If someone takes over a neutral zone, they get all takeover points plus neutral bonus. If a player does a revisit, they get half the takeover points the zone is worth. Which TP a zone is worth is linked to its takeover frequency. The highest TP value on a zone is 185 and the lowest 65. For a zone a player can thus get a maximum of 235 TP (185+50 neutral bonus) and a minimum of 33 TP (rounded) (65/2 revisit). Zones with low takeover frequency are considered more difficult to take and therefore generate higher TP. For the same reason, they have lower PPH instead.

Points per hour (PPH) is the sum of points a player receives when owning one or more zones. The current point per hour is shown in the left top corner in the turf app. All PPH from the zones the player owns are added together and divided by 60 and are then continuously received every minute. It is therefore possible to receive point per hour from a zone the player has held less than one hour. For a zone a player can get a maximum of 9 PPH and a minimum of 1 PPH. What PPH a zone gives is linked to its TP according to the formula: PPH=(200-TP)/15. This means that all zones have given the owner exactly the same amount if the player is allowed to keep the zone for exactly 15 hours (200 points).

0-PPH-zones was a zone score option introduced in front of Round 41. These zones were all located in places where the turf activity was very low. During round 122, all O-PPH-zones were phased out and changed to 185/+1. An O-PPH-zone was a zone that did not give any points per hour (PPH) and 250 take points (TP) at the take and was in an area with low turf activity. The reason why these were introduced 2013, was stated to be that the game developers wanted to make it less attractive for players to go to inactive countries and take over a large number of zones, in order to get many points per hour (PPH). The reason why 0-PPH-zones were phased out 2020, was to increase the attractiveness of players in new areas. Using Tinkerbell, 0-PPH-zones could change value in the middle of a round instead of waiting for Fairy system - unlike other types of zones. The point adjustment took place when a 0-PPH-zone was taken three times during the same round. The score was then adjusted to 170/+2 immediately after the third take. If the first zone a brand new player took was a 0-PPH-zone, the score was adjusted directly to 185/+1.

Fairy 

Fairy is an automated system that reads and measures the number of takeovers that have occurred in each particular zone.
Each zone is provided with takeover points and points per hour (PPH). Fairy changes them to points depending on the action happening in that zone. The more takeovers during the ongoing round, the fewer takeover points, and the higher the PPH for the next round.
Fairy is normally activated every month just before the new round. The name Fairy is a clue to the purpose of the process, which is to make the game fairer. But subjective and objective justice is an ongoing discussion in a game like Turf.
Every time Fairy runs, it can either change the zone two stages upwards in PPH or down one in PPH.
For instance, if a zone currently has 140/+4 (Takeover Points/+PPH) it can either change upwards two stages 125/+5 or 110/+6 depending on previous round takeovers.
However, if the takeovers were very low it can instead change down one stage into 155/+3. It is possible for a zone to be unchanged; not every zone changes.
Zones created during the previous round or a few days before the start of the previous round cannot change value as the activity in a new zone is not considered representative of how it will be later. The zone then continues to retain its original set value until the next round, when it can change value as normal again.

Ranks 
The rank of a turfer is the level the player has achieved via the turfer's total points. The rank is kept in the start of new rounds, and is thus not based on the round score of the turfer.
Today there are in total 60 different ranks that a player can reach (or, sixty different levels that a player can be at) as a turfer.

Medals 

Medals are awards given to players for achieving or doing certain things in Turf, for example, taking or assisting of zones, top position after completing a round and more. Medals are comparable to what in some games are called achievements. Players keep their medals between rounds. They are not reset.

Some medals builds on top of previous and are replaced with better versions in case they are achieved. If a player for instance takes thousand zones in total and gets the Take-1000 medal it will replace the Take-500 medal which he or she previously had.

All medals can be taken with assist with the exception of Revisitor, Neutralizer, Event medals, Greed medals and Bonanza medals.

Supporter 

A supporter is a turfer who has donated money to the Turf project and hence been given extra functions in the game. A supporter is often shown in the game with a flash decal.
Because Turf is free to download and does not contain any ads, the project's success and development depend on voluntary donations and in some cases corporate sponsorships. The solution to cover overhead was initially to donate money directly to the project via the website (and thus a player would receive the now-rare donation medals), but this has been replaced by the supporter function since November 2013.
Supporters are granted access to the following extra features in the game:

 Wardrobe: assigns the player their own personal wardrobe where the player can customize the appearance of their avatar.
 League game: more in-depth overview of the leagues and players' placements in the groups.
 Statistics: the opportunity to see number of regions visited, total number of takeovers, number of assisted takeovers, round statistics, session statistics, experience points, total turf distance and more.
 Show unique zones: a counter for the number of unique zones taken.
 Assign supporter days: feature that allows a supporter to donate supporter days to another player.

Turf Crew 

Turf Crew is a group of volunteers that helps Turf developers. The roles in Turf Crew are:

 Abuse Manager: Abuse Manager is the part of Turf Crew that is responsible for dealing with cheating and violations of the welfare rules in Turf. 
 Examples of cheating are:
 A player moves abnormally fast over long distances on the map and/or jumps between different positions on the map that are abnormally far apart.
 A player modifies/hacks the client to be able to take over zones in places where the player is not.
 Multiple players share the same account and/or device and through this make them appear as a single player.
 Examples of violation of well-being rules are:
 A player harasses another player through, for example, the GPS information in the game.
 A player expresses himself vulgarly, hostilely, threateningly or unpleasantly in the chat.
 A player spams (sends very many messages) in the chat for a short time.
 A player encourages cheating and/or dangerous behavior that could lead to personal injury or other serious consequences.
 Event Manager: Event Manager is the part of Turf Crew that helps and informs players and others to organize Event of various kinds.
 Three Parts: The Event Manager role is divided into three different branches: one for school events, one for scout organizations and one for all other Events.
 Country Organizers: Country Organizers is a part of Turf Crew and is a zone maker in charge of a country or in other words, a middle manager who is between a zone general and a zone maker.
 Forum Admin: Forum Admin in Turf Crew is responsible for administering the forum by e.g. deleting inappropriate entries and throwing out users who cannot behave.
 Information Manager: Information Manager is a title for the part of Turf Crew that mostly helps with spreading information and to promote Turf. 
 Tasks: Other than spreading information on Turf's webpage, there are a lot of questions at the forum to answer. When Turf is launched in new countries time is used to find ways to promote Turf there. A lot of time is also put at the Facebook page and Facebook group. If there was more time left time would be spent at searching for companies who would sponsor Turf. Much more time could also be spent on marketing in countries where Turf's marketing is not yet self-sustaining. Probably get in touch with various media and forums on the internet. Maybe even get in touch with local turfers and get tips from them. Maybe they provide tools to market Turf in their place. According to SaLa, the best way to get more tourists is the tell-a-friend method. The next best is media and then maybe posters. 
 Turf and Media: Anyone who manages to fix a date with the media and get something published is rewarded with one of the Expandator medals.
 Issue Manager: Issue Manager in Turf Crew is responsible for managing issue reports in the issue tracking system and inform Turf Developers which errors are serious or affect many players.
 Master of Stats: Master of Stats is the creator of Warded. He helps Turf Developers collect interesting game stats.
 Wiki Manager: Wiki Manager or wiki administrator is a member of Turf Crew responsible for the administration of TurfWiki.
 Zone General: The Zone General manages zone-related issues and is boss over Country Organizers and Zone makers.
 Zone makers: Zone makers are a part of Turf Crew. They build zones, accept zone suggestions, take care of zone reports and spread Turf around the world. Zone makers may not lay out zones in the municipalities in which they themselves are most active.

Turf League 

Turf League is an official league based game element in Turf that includes a total of ten leagues with players. All active players in Turf are placed on a special toplist that is separate from the other top lists, where the players rise and fall in the leagues based on their performance during the round. A player can only look at their own placement in the league system unless they are a supporter, who can view the whole league.

The League system based on that players initially start at the bottom of the league system that have 10 levels. Every League has a certain number of groups that have 10 players. The players rise and fall in the leagues at the end of all rounds, based on their accumulated points. Rising to the next level requires the player to have the most points in his group thereby placing themself as number one. If a player ends up last or second last in his group he will fall to the league below. All players that have not changed league level during the round are randomly placed in new groups in that level. Whereafter the process begins again at the start of the new round. If a player is on lowest level (League 9) and has not taken any zones during the round. They will be removed from the League system until that time they again takes a zone. "New" players will automatically start from the bottom level. There are currently no specific medals connected to the League game, but there is an exclusive outfit that is unlocked for the avatar when reaching the Elite League.

References

External links 
 
 Turf articles in media (in Swedish)

2010 video games
Android (operating system) games
Fitness games
Free-to-play video games
IOS games
Location-based games
Video games developed in Sweden